Eberhard & Co is a Swiss luxury watch company, founded in 1887 in La Chaux-de-Fonds, Neuchâtel, Switzerland by Swiss watch making industrialist Georges Eberhard.

History

1887-1900: Early history
The Eberhard & Co manufacture was founded on 1887 in La Chaux-de-Fonds, the historic birthplace of the Swiss watchmaking industry by George-Emile Eberhard.
Eberhard was the son of a prominent Bernese family tracing its origins back to the 10th century, which was involved in the development of the Swiss watchmaking industry. His father early initiated him to the art of watch making and Eberhard was only 22 when he founded the company.

1900–1947
In 1907, the company has become one of the largest Swiss watch manufacture and inaugurated its new headquarters which takes an entire block at the very center of rue Leopold Robert, La Chaux-de-Fonds's main avenue. The five-story building was reminiscent of the 19th century Paris works of Georges-Eugène Haussmann, designed in the distinctive Beaux Arts style with a round tower topped by a large eagle sculpture, and has become one of the city's well-known landmarks and its highest structure until the 1960s.
In 1919, Eberhard's sons, Georges and Maurice took over the company.

1947–1987
After the end of World War II, the manufacture resumed its activities and, in 1947, made its first woman's watch, starting its jewelry collections.

1987–present
Since 1996, the manufacture has decided to focus on luxury king-size wristwatches and launched a new Grande Taille (Super Size) collection. 
True to its history of technical challenges, Eberhard & Co launched in 1997 the 8 days "a manually winding mechanical watch that needs to be rewound every eight days only" thanks to a special winding device and, in 2001, it launched the Chrono 4 "the first chronograph in the history of watchmaking whose counters are arranged in one row".
In 2017 Eberhard & Co. celebrated its 130th anniversary of uninterrupted watch production. A book entitled "The Art of Defying Time" was published for the occasion.

References

External links
 
Eberhard & Co Collections, Eberhardwatches
Eberhard & Co profile, Swisstime

Watch manufacturing companies of Switzerland
Swiss watch brands
Manufacturing companies established in 1887
Swiss companies established in 1887
Design companies established in 1887
Companies based in the canton of Neuchâtel